William Guy Mallory (May 30, 1935 – May 25, 2018) was an American football player and coach. He served as the head football coach at Miami University (1969–1973), the University of Colorado at Boulder (1974–1978), Northern Illinois University (1980–1983), and Indiana University (1984–1996), compiling a career college football record of 168–129–4.

Playing career
Mallory played football at Miami University for coaches Ara Parseghian and John Pont.

Coaching career
Mallory is the Indiana Hoosiers' winningest football coach, having compiled a 69–77–3 record. Before taking over the head coaching reins at Indiana in 1984, Mallory coached three other schools to national prominence. While compiling a 168–129–4 career record, Mallory became one of only a handful of coaches in history to guide three different programs to top 20 finishes in national polls. In 1987, Mallory became the first coach to be awarded back-to-back Big Ten coach-of-the-year honors. While at Indiana, Mallory led the Hoosiers to six bowl games including victories in the 1988 Liberty Bowl, and the 1991 Copper Bowl. He also led IU to a top 20 ranking in 1987 and 1988.

Early in his coaching career, Mallory served as assistant to Woody Hayes at Ohio State University, Carmen Cozza at Yale University and Doyt Perry at Bowling Green State University.

Mallory is a member of Miami University's Cradle of Coaches. He is also a member of the Athletic Halls of Fame at Miami University and Indiana University, the Mid-American Conference, the Indiana Football Hall of Fame and the Phi Kappa Tau Hall of Fame.

Mallory was the 15th head college football coach for the Northern Illinois University Huskies located in DeKalb, Illinois and he held that position for four seasons, from 1980 until 1983. He coached the Huskies to victory in the 1983 California Bowl, the school's first major bowl game appearance. Mallory's career coaching record at Northern Illinois was 25 wins, 19 losses, and 0 ties. This ranks him
sixth at Northern Illinois in total wins and seventh at NIU in winning percentage.

Death
Mallory died in Bloomington, Indiana, on May 25, 2018, just five days before his 83rd birthday and less than three weeks before his 60th wedding anniversary with his wife Ellie, following brain surgery from a fall on May 22.

Head coaching record

References

1935 births
2018 deaths
American football ends
Bowling Green Falcons football coaches
Colorado Buffaloes football coaches
Indiana Hoosiers football coaches
Miami RedHawks football coaches
Miami RedHawks football players
Northern Illinois Huskies football coaches
Ohio State Buckeyes football coaches
Yale Bulldogs football coaches
Coaches of American football from Ohio
Players of American football from Ohio
Sportspeople from Sandusky, Ohio